The 2023 Damallsvenskan is the 36th season of the Swedish women's association football top division, Damallsvenskan. The league will begin on 24 March 2023, and end on 11 November 2023. The league will have an eight-week break between rounds 17 and 18 (9 July - 3 September).

Växjö DFF and IFK Norrköping DFK are new teams for this season after being promoted from Elitettan. Eskilstuna were not granted a license and will be replaced in the league by Uppsala.

Teams 

Notes:
a According to each club information page previously available at the Swedish Football Association website for Damallsvenskan, unless otherwise noted. Since May 2018 this is no longer present. Numbers were usually lower than official stadium numbers.
b According to Kristianstads DFF's history web page.

Standings

Results

Positions by Round
The table lists the positions of teams after each week of matches. In order to preserve chronological progress, any matches moved from their original game round are not included in the round at which they were originally scheduled, but added to the full round they were played immediately afterwards. For example, if a match is scheduled for round 13, but then postponed and played between rounds 16 and 17, it will be added to the standings for round 16.

Results by round

References

External links 
 Season at soccerway.com
 Season at SvFF

Damallsvenskan seasons
Sweden
Sweden
2023 in Swedish association football leagues
2023 in Swedish women's football